The 1972 Jordanian  League (known as The Jordanian  League,   was the 22nd season of Jordan League since its inception in 1944, In the 1972 it was called (first division league).  Al-Faisaly won its 13th title after winning a title playoff match against Al-Jazeera 1-0.

Teams

Map

League table 

 Al-Faisaly won its 13th title after winning a title playoff match against Al-Jazeera 1-0.

References
RSSSF

External links
 Jordan Football Association website

Jordanian Pro League seasons
Jordan
Jordan
football